Kallithea is a village and a community in the municipal unit of Tolofon, southern Phocis, Greece. The community consists of the villages Kallithea, Agia Eirini, Agios Nikolaos, Agios Spyridonas, Klovinos,  Flampourakia and the uninhabited islands Agios Nikolaos and Prasoudi. Kallithea is situated in the mountains near the coast of the Gulf of Corinth. The two largest villages, Agios Nikolaos (population 81 in 2011) and Agios Spyridonas (pop. 152), are on the coast. Kallithea is 5 km northwest of Tolofon, 26 km southwest of Amfissa and 27 km east of Nafpaktos. The Greek National Road 48 (Nafpaktos - Delphi - Livadeia) passes along the coast. There is a ferry service from Agios Nikolaos to Aigio, Peloponnese.

Population

External links
 Kallithea GTP Travel Pages

See also

List of settlements in Phocis

References

Populated places in Phocis